Robert Nelson Jacobs (born 1954) is an American screenwriter.  In 2000, he received an Academy Award nomination for Best Adapted Screenplay for Chocolat. Jacobs is a board member and past president of the Writers Guild Foundation, a non-profit organization devoted to promoting and preserving the craft of writing for the screen.

Biography
Jacobs grew up in the Pocono Mountains of Pennsylvania. He attended Yale University, where he received the Curtis Literary Prize for his short fiction and graduated with honors. He earned his master's degree from the Iowa Writers’ Workshop. Jacobs began his career as a writer of short stories that were published in little, prestigious magazines that generated little, prestigious income. Jacobs’ love of movies brought him to California, where it took a number of years for his work to finally start paying the rent. Jacobs’ screenplay credits include Out to Sea, Dinosaur, Chocolat, The Shipping News, Flushed Away, The Water Horse, and Extraordinary Measures.

Filmography

References

External links

1954 births
American male screenwriters
Living people
Screenwriters from Pennsylvania
University of Iowa alumni
Yale University alumni